Bollywood Theater is an Indian restaurant with two locations in Portland, Oregon's Richmond and Vernon neighborhoods.

Description and history
The restaurants are located along Northeast Alberta Street and Southeast Division Street. The northeast location opened in 2012, and the southeast restaurant began operating in February 2014. Troy MacLarty, a former cook at Chez Panisse, owns the restaurant and serves as its chef.

Reception
Matthew Korfage of Willamette Week described Bollywood as "pure Portland: upscale street food amid mismatched tables, variegated artisanal knickknackery and deeply ironized shrines to foreign film". Ron Scott and Janey Wong included the restaurant in Eater Portland's 2022 list of "Where to Find Exceptional Indian Food in Portland".

See also

 Food Paradise (season 13)
 List of Indian restaurants

References

External links
 

2012 establishments in Oregon
Asian restaurants in Portland, Oregon
Indian-American culture in Portland, Oregon
Indian restaurants in Oregon
Restaurants established in 2012
Richmond, Portland, Oregon
Vernon, Portland, Oregon